Thomas Cooke or Thomas Cook may refer to:

Authors
Thomas Cooke (author) (1703–1756), English translator of the classics
Thomas H. Cook (born 1947), American crime writer

Entertainers
Thomas Simpson Cooke (1782–1848), Irish composer, singer and theatre musician
Thomas Taplin Cooke (1782–1866), English showman
Thomas Cooke (actor) (1786–1864), English actor
Tommy Cook (actor) (born 1930), American actor and former child star

Politicians
Thomas Cook (MP for Marlborough), Member of Parliament (MP) for Marlborough, 1399
Thomas Cook (MP for Exeter), MP for Exeter, 1417–1442
Thomas Cooke (mayor) (died 1478), Lord Mayor of London
Thomas B. Cooke (1778–1853), United States Representative from New York
Thomas Cook (MP for North Norfolk) (1902–1970), Member of the United Kingdom Parliament for North Norfolk, 1931–1945
Thomas Cook (Scottish politician) (1908–1952), Member of the United Kingdom Parliament for Dundee
Thomas H. Cooke Jr., mayor of East Orange, New Jersey, 1978–1986

Military
Thomas Cooke (British Army officer) (1841–1912), British general
Thomas Cooke (soldier, born 1881) (1881–1916), Australian recipient of the Victoria Cross

Religion
Thomas Cooke (bishop) (1792–1870), Canadian Roman Catholic bishop
Thomas Cook (bishop) (1866–1928), Anglican Bishop of Lewes

Sportspeople
Thomas Cooke (English footballer) (fl. 1880s), English footballer for Notts County
Thomas Cooke (soccer) (1885–1964), American football player, and member of the 1904 US Olympic Team
Tommy Cook (sportsman) (1901–1950), Sussex batsman, footballer and football manager
Tom Cook (1907–1961), Canadian ice hockey player
Thomas Cooke (footballer, born 1913) (1913–1974), English footballer for Bournemouth & Boscombe Athletic and Mansfield Town

Other people
Thomas Cooke (banker) (died 1752), English merchant and banker
Thomas Cooke (scientific instrument maker) (1807–1868), telescope maker, founder of T. Cooke & Sons
Thomas Cook (1808–1892), travel entrepreneur
Thomas F. Cooke (1863–1941), Iowa and California banker and Los Angeles City Council member
Thomas D. Cook (born 1941), British sociologist

Corporations
Thomas Cook Holidays, British package holiday provider
Thomas Cook Group, a former global travel group
Thomas Cook AG, parent company of Thomas Cook companies prior to its merger with MyTravel plc
Thomas Cook & Son, a travel company founded in 1871 before dissolving into Thomas Cook AG
Thomas Cook Airlines Belgium, a former Belgian airline
Thomas Cook India, an Indian travel company owned by Fairfax Financial
Thomas Cook Airlines, an airline in the United Kingdom
Thomas Cook Airlines Scandinavia, a Danish charter airline

See also
T. Cooke & Sons, a mathematical instrument company
Thomas Coke (disambiguation) (pronounced Cook)
Sir Thomas Cookes, 2nd Baronet

Cooke, Thomas